Charles was a 44-gun second rank ship of the line of the English navy, built by Peter Pett at Woolwich and launched in 1632.

Charles was renamed Liberty in 1649. She ran aground and was wrecked off Harwich, Essex in October 1650.

Notes

References

Lavery, Brian (2003) The Ship of the Line - Volume 1: The development of the battlefleet 1650-1850. Conway Maritime Press. .

Ships of the English navy
Ships built in Woolwich
Shipwrecks
1630s ships
17th-century maritime incidents